"How Many Words" is the official second single by the singer-songwriter Blake Lewis, from his debut album A.D.D. (Audio Day Dream). The song was expected to be followed by "Know My Name", and then "Without You". However, due to being dropped by Arista Records, "How Many Words" is the final single from his debut album. He is expected to release a single from his second album at the end of 2009. The single was released to mainstream radio format on March 10, 2008. Also, an EP featuring remixes of the song was released onto iTunes on May 13, 2008. Lewis performed the song live on the March 6, 2008, results show of the seventh season of American Idol.

Chart performance
The single has sold 94,000 copies to date.

References

2007 songs
2008 singles
Blake Lewis songs
Arista Records singles
Songs written by Sam Hollander
Songs written by Dave Katz
Song recordings produced by S*A*M and Sluggo
Songs written by Blake Lewis